Family with sequence similarity 111 member A is a protein that in humans is encoded by the FAM111A gene.

Function

The protein encoded by this gene is cell-cycle regulated, and has nuclear localization. The C-terminal half of the protein shares homology with trypsin-like peptidases and it contains a PCNA-interacting peptide (PIP) box that is necessary for its co-localization with proliferating cell nuclear antigen (PCNA). Reduced expression of this gene resulted in DNA replication defects, consistent with the demonstrated role for this gene in Simian Virus 40 (SV40) viral replication. Monoallelic variants in this gene have been associated with dominantly inherited Kenny-Caffey syndrome (KCS; MIM 127000) and the more severe osteocraniostenosis (OCS; MIM 602361), both characterized by short stature, hypoparathyroidism, bone development abnormalities, and hypocalcemia. Alternative splicing of the FAM111A transcript results in multiple transcript variants. [provided by RefSeq, Aug 2015].

References

Further reading